Tegostoma richteri is a species of moth in the family Crambidae. It is found in Ethiopia.

This species has a wingspan of 16–18 mm.

See also
List of moths of Ethiopia

References

Endemic fauna of Ethiopia
Moths described in 1963
Odontiini
Moths of Africa
Taxa named by Hans Georg Amsel